De Winton's long-eared bat (Laephotis wintoni) is a species of vesper bat in the family Vespertilionidae. It can be found in the following countries: Ethiopia, Kenya, Lesotho, South Africa, and Tanzania. It is found in these habitats: dry savanna, Mediterranean-type shrubby vegetation, and subtropical or tropical high-altitude grassland. It is considered a species of Least Concern.

References

Laephotis
Mammals described in 1901
Taxonomy articles created by Polbot
Taxa named by Oldfield Thomas
Bats of Africa